Roman Polanski: A Film Memoir is a 2011 documentary film directed by Laurent Bouzereau. The film is about Roman Polanski's life, career, and legal issues.

Synopsis
In two conversations (one while on house arrest due to his arrest in September 2009 and other as a "free man") with his longtime friend Andrew Braunsberg, the filmmaker Roman Polanski discusses his life, career and the legal issues he has been facing since his 1977 arrest for sexual assault.

Cast
 Roman Polanski as himself
 Andrew Braunsberg as himself

Reception
, Roman Polanski: A Film Memoir has an approval rating of 91% on review aggregator Rotten Tomatoes, based on 11 reviews with an average rating of 5.86/10.

Christopher Schobert from the IndieWire wrote: "Roman Polanski: A Film Memoir is a rare opportunity to hear a master filmmaker speak about his life. Both his haters and fans will agree, it is a highly watchable documentary. But don't expect either group to feel they have heard the whole story".

Roman Polanski: A Film Memoir was nominated in the category Best Documentary at the 2012 British Independent Film Awards, but lost it for The Imposter.

References

External links
 

2011 documentary films
2011 films
Documentary films about film directors and producers
German documentary films
Italian documentary films
British documentary films
2010s English-language films
2010s British films
2010s German films